= Amplify Credit Union =

American credit union

- Type: Credit Union
- Industry: Financial services
- Founded: 1967; 59 years ago
- Headquarters: Austin, Texas, United States
- Area served: Texas
- Key people: Kendel Martin (Chair, Board of Directors); Kendall Garrison (President and CEO)
- Services: Banking, credit, and loans
- Total assets: 1.25 billion (2025)
- Members: 45,844 (2026)
- Website: www.goamplify.com

Amplify Credit Union is a credit union headquartered in Austin, Texas.

== History ==
Amplify was founded in 1967 as IBM Texas Employees Federal Credit Union.

In October 2006 it changed its name to Amplify Federal Credit Union, and it later became Amplify Credit Union. As of August 2026, the union had 45,844 members and held around $1.25 billion in assets. It has four physical branches—two in Austin, along with locations in nearby Round Rock and Cedar Park—and also operates a “virtual branch” for online services.

== Membership eligibility ==
Membership is open to anyone who lives, works, or studies in Texas.

== Notable events ==
Amplify proposed eliminating all banking fees—including fees for overdrafts, account maintenance and wire transfers—in its 2021 business plan. The policy was implemented in February 2022, which Amplify said made it the first financial institution in the US to offer entirely fee-free banking.

== Community involvement / philanthropy ==
In 2023, Amplify hosted a Central Texas Affordability Summit, inviting local community leaders and businesses to discuss ways to mitigate the rising cost of living in Austin and surrounds. A second such event was hosted the following year, and a third followed in April 2026. Amplify also financed the construction of Mustard Seed Village, a tiny home development in Round Rock aimed specifically at providing affordable housing to low-income local residents.

The company's employees logged 2,588 volunteer hours in 2025 through its Community Care Hours program.
